Ropica wallisi is a species of beetle in the family Cerambycidae. It was described by Breuning in 1970. It is known from Polynesia.

References

wallisi
Beetles described in 1970